Events from the year 1798 in Russia

Incumbents
 Monarch – Paul I

Events

 
 S.M. Kirov Military Medical Academy

Births

Deaths

References

1798 in Russia
Years of the 18th century in the Russian Empire